Galati may refer to:
 Galati Mamertino, municipality in the Metropolitan City of Messina in Sicily, Italy
 Galați County, in Moldavia region of Romania
 Galati (surname), surname

See also 
 Galați (disambiguation)